God's Fury is the third studio album from the hip hop duo OuterSpace, released on September 30, 2008, by Babygrande Records. The album features collaborations by Jedi Mind Tricks member Vinnie Paz, Sick Jacken & Cynic of Psycho Realm, and fellow A.O.T.P. members Doap Nixon, Reef The Lost Cauze, Des Devious, King Syze, Celph Titled, and Chief Kamachi.

Track listing

References

2008 albums
OuterSpace albums
Babygrande Records albums